Trichaea is a genus of moths of the family Crambidae described by Gottlieb August Wilhelm Herrich-Schäffer in 1866.

Species
Trichaea binigrata (Dognin, 1912)
Trichaea caerulealis (Schaus, 1912)
Trichaea eusebia (Druce, 1902)
Trichaea flammeolalis (Möschler, 1890)
Trichaea fortunata (Dognin, 1905)
Trichaea hades Druce, 1889
Trichaea nigrans (Druce, 1902)
Trichaea pilicornis Herrich-Schäffer, 1866
Trichaea pudens (Druce, 1902)
Trichaea pulchralis (Schaus, 1912)

Former species
Trichaea glaucopidalis (Oberthür, 1881)

References

Spilomelinae
Crambidae genera
Taxa named by Gottlieb August Wilhelm Herrich-Schäffer